Glenburn is a census-designated place (CDP) in Glenburn Township, Lackawanna County, Pennsylvania, United States. The population was 953 at the 2010 census. Glenburn is located north of Clarks Summit and south of Dalton.

Geography
Glenburn is located at  (41.516361, -75.724286). Combined U.S. Route 6/11 (Lackawanna Trail) runs through the community as a four-lane divided highway, leading south to Scranton and north  to Factoryville.

The community is in the valley of the South Branch of Tunkhannock Creek, a north- and west-flowing tributary of the Susquehanna River.

Demographics

As of the census of 2010, there were 953 people, 385 households, and 274 families residing in the CDP. The population density was 544.6 people per square mile (210.3/km2). There were 423 housing units at an average density of 241.7/sq mi (94.4/km2). The racial makeup of the CDP was 95.3% White, 0.6% African American, 0.1% Native American, 1.2% Asian, 0.2% from other races, and 2.6% from two or more races. Hispanic or Latino of any race were 2.7% of the population.

There were 385 households, out of which 28.3% had children under the age of 18 living with them, 61% were married couples living together, 6.5% had a female householder with no husband present, and 28.8% were non-families. 24.4% of all households were made up of individuals, and 10.9% had someone living alone who was 65 years of age or older. The average household size was 2.48 and the average family size was 2.97.

In the CDP, the population was spread out, with 21.1% under the age of 18, 61.3% from 18 to 64, and 17.6% who were 65 years of age or older. The median age was 47.3 years.

At the 2000 census, the median income for a household in the CDP was $44,750, and the median income for a family was $59,063. Males had a median income of $43,333 versus $30,833 for females. The per capita income for the CDP was $28,259. About 2.0% of families and 3.5% of the population were below the poverty line, including 1.3% of those under age 18 and 8.3% of those age 65 or over.

Education
There are no public schools currently within the boundaries of Glenburn. Students residing in Glenburn attend schools in the top-ranked Abington Heights School District. Elementary students attend either Waverly Elementary or Clarks Summit Elementary schools. All middle school students attend Abington Heights Middle School and high school students at Abington Heights High School.

References

Census-designated places in Lackawanna County, Pennsylvania
Census-designated places in Pennsylvania